Julio Antonio Medina Morales, also known as Julio Medina III (born 14 July 1976) is a retired football midfielder.

He currently manages Liga Panameña de Futbol team Chorrillo.

Club career
Nicknamed Puchito, Medina started his career at Árabe Unido and played in Uruguay for Nacional and Platense before moving abroad again to join Salvadoran side Águila in December 2004. He left them in summer 2005 for Guatemalan giants Comunicaciones, only to leave them after a season for Honduran outfit Marathón where he played alongside compatriot Donaldo González.

After a return to Árabe Unido, the little free-kick specialist joined Chorrillo in January 2007, the only other club he played for in Panama.

International career
Medina made his debut for Panama in an October 1999 friendly match against Trinidad and Tobago and has earned a total of 44 caps, scoring no goals. He represented his country in 21 FIFA World Cup qualification matches and was a member of the 2005 CONCACAF Gold Cup team, who finished second in the tournament.

His final international was a June 2008 friendly match against Canada.

Managerial career
After retiring, Medina was named assistant at Árabe Unido and later became manager of Chorrillo and immediately won the 2014 Clausura. He was released by Chorrillo in April 2015.

References

External links

1976 births
Living people
Sportspeople from Panama City
Association football midfielders
Panamanian footballers
Panama international footballers
2005 UNCAF Nations Cup players
2005 CONCACAF Gold Cup players
C.D. Árabe Unido players
Club Nacional de Football players
C.D. Águila footballers
Comunicaciones F.C. players
C.D. Marathón players
Unión Deportivo Universitario players
Panamanian expatriate footballers
Expatriate footballers in Uruguay
Expatriate footballers in El Salvador
Expatriate footballers in Guatemala
Expatriate footballers in Honduras
Panamanian football managers
Liga Panameña de Fútbol managers
Chorrillo F.C. managers
Central American Games silver medalists for Panama
Central American Games medalists in football